Myrrh (from Semitic, but see § Etymology) is a gum-resin extracted from a number of small, thorny tree species of the genus Commiphora. Myrrh resin has been used throughout history as a perfume, incense and medicine. Myrrh mixed with posca or wine was widely used in many ancient cultures to produce pleasurable feelings and as an analgesic.

Extraction and production

When a wound on a tree penetrates through the bark and into the sapwood, the tree secretes a resin. Myrrh gum, like frankincense, is such a resin. Myrrh is harvested by repeatedly wounding the trees to bleed the gum, which is waxy and coagulates quickly. After the harvest, the gum becomes hard and glossy. The gum is yellowish and may be either clear or opaque. It darkens deeply as it ages, and white streaks emerge.

Myrrh gum is commonly harvested from the species Commiphora myrrha. Another commonly used name, Commiphora molmol, is now considered a synonym for Commiphora myrrha.

Commiphora myrrha is native to Somalia, Oman, Yemen, Eritrea, Somali Region of Ethiopia and parts of Saudi Arabia. Meetiga, a trade name for Arabian myrrh, is more brittle and gummy than the Somali variety and does not have the latter's white markings.

Liquid myrrh, or stacte, which was written about by Pliny, was formerly a greatly valued ingredient of Jewish holy incense, but is no longer commercially available.

Etymology
The word myrrh corresponds to a common Semitic root m-r-r meaning "bitter", as in Arabic   and Aramaic  . Its name entered the English language by way of the Hebrew Bible, in which it is called  , and also later as a Semitic loanword. It appears in the Greek myth about Myrrha, and later in the Septuagint; in the Ancient Greek language, the related word  became a general term for perfume.

Attributed medicinal properties

Medicine

In pharmacology, myrrh has been used as an antiseptic in mouthwashes, gargles, and toothpastes. It has also been used in liniments and salves applied to abrasions and other minor skin ailments. Myrrh has been used as an analgesic for toothache pain and in liniments applied to bruises, aching muscles, and sprains.

Myrrh gum has often been claimed to reduce the symptoms of indigestion, ulcers, colds, cough, asthma, respiratory congestion, arthritis, and cancer.

Religious ritual

In Ancient Egypt and Punt (Horn of Africa)
The fifth-dynasty ruler of Egypt, King Sahure, recorded the earliest attested expedition to the land of Punt, the modern day Horn of Africa (particularly Somalia), whose members brought back large quantities of myrrh, frankincense, malachite and electrum. The expedition also brought back wild animals (particularly cheetahs), a secretary bird (Sagittarius serpentarius), giraffes and Hamadryas baboons (which were sacred to the Ancient Egyptians), ebony, ivory and animal skins. In a relief from his mortuary temple celebrating the success of this expedition, Sahure is shown tending a myrrh tree in the garden of his palace. The relief, entitled "Sahure's splendor soars up to heaven", is the only one in Egyptian art that depicts a king gardening. Myrrh was used by the ancient Egyptians, along with natron, for the embalming of mummies.

In the Hebrew Bible

Myrrh is mentioned as a rare perfume in several places in the Hebrew Bible. In , the traders to whom Jacob's sons sold their brother Joseph had "camels ... loaded with spices, balm, and myrrh," and  specifies that Moses was to use 500 shekels of liquid myrrh as a core ingredient of the sacred anointing oil.

Myrrh was an ingredient of Ketoret: the consecrated incense used in the First and Second Temples at Jerusalem, as described in the Hebrew Bible and Talmud. An offering was made of the Ketoret on a special incense altar and was an important component of the temple service. Myrrh is also listed as an ingredient in the holy anointing oil used to anoint the tabernacle, high priests and kings.

In ancient Nabataea
Myrrh was recorded in the first century BC by Diodorus Siculus to have been traded overland and by sea via Nabatean caravans and sea ports, which transported it from Southern Arabia to their capital city of Petra, from which it was distributed throughout the Mediterranean region.

In the New Testament
Myrrh is mentioned in the New Testament as one of the three gifts (with gold and frankincense) that the magi "from the East" presented to the Christ Child. Myrrh was also present at Jesus' death and burial. Jesus was offered wine and myrrh at his crucifixion. According to John's Gospel, Nicodemus and Joseph of Arimathea brought a 100-pound mixture of myrrh and aloes to wrap Jesus' body. The Gospel of Matthew relates that as Jesus went to the cross, he was given vinegar to drink mingled with gall: and when he had tasted thereof, he would not drink (Matthew 27:34); the Gospel of Mark describes the drink as wine mingled with myrrh (Mark 15:23).

In contemporary Christianity
Because of its mention in the New Testament, myrrh is an incense offered during some Christian liturgical celebrations (see Thurible). Liquid myrrh is sometimes added to egg tempera in the making of icons. Myrrh is mixed with frankincense and sometimes more scents and is used in the Eastern Orthodox, Oriental Orthodox, traditional Roman Catholic, and Anglican/Episcopal churches.

Myrrh is also used to prepare the sacramental chrism used by many churches of both Eastern and Western rites. In the Middle East, the Eastern Orthodox Church traditionally uses oil scented with myrrh (and other fragrances) to perform the sacrament of chrismation, which is commonly referred to as "receiving the Chrism".

In Islam
According to the hadith of Muhammad, narrated by Abu Nuaim on the authority of Abban bin Saleh bin Anas, Muhammad said, "Fumigate your houses with mugwort, myrrh and thyme." (Kanz-ul-Ummal). The Encyclopedia of Islamic Herbal Medicine mentions the same hadith: "The Messenger of Allah stated, 'Fumigate your houses with al-shih, murr, and sa'tar.'" The author states that this use of the word "murr" refers specifically to Commiphora myrrha. The other two are Al-Shih (possibly mugwort) and Sa'tar (or Za'atar - thyme).

Ancient myrrh
Pedanius Dioscorides described the myrrh of the first century AD as most likely to refer to a "species of mimosa", describing it "like the Egyptian thorn". He describes its appearance and leaf structure as "spinnate-winged".

Other products that can be confused with myrrh 
The oleo-gum-resins of a number of other Commiphora species are also used as perfumes, medicines (such as aromatic wound dressings), and incense ingredients. These myrrh-like resins are known as bdellium (including guggul and African bdellium), balsam (balm of Gilead or Mecca balsam) and opopanax (bisabol).

Fragrant "myrrh beads" are made from the crushed seeds of Detarium microcarpum, an unrelated West African tree. These beads are traditionally worn by married women in Mali as multiple strands around the hips.

The name "myrrh" is also applied to the potherb Myrrhis odorata, otherwise known as "cicely" or "sweet cicely".

As of 2022 Myrrh has been branded as Synthetic Cannabinoid by Amazon.

See also
Bdellium
Chrism
Frankincense
Myroblyte saint
Naturalis Historia
Pliny the Elder

References

Further reading

 (US ), pp. 107–122.
, pp. 226–227, with additions
 Abyssine Myrrh
 The One Earth Herbal Sourcebook: Everything You Need to Know About Chinese, Western, and Ayurvedic Herbal Treatments  by Ph.D., A.H.G., D.Ay, Alan Keith Tillotson, O.M.D., L.Ac., Nai-shing Hu Tillotson, and M.D., Robert Abel Jr.
 ( A good review on its antiparasitic activities) .

External links

History of Myrrh and Frankincense (www.itmonline.org)

 
Commiphora
Essential oils
Incense material
Plants used in Ayurveda
Plants used in traditional Chinese medicine
Resins
Spices
Natural gums